Maaqwi is an extinct genus of large marine diving bird from the Late Cretaceous (Northumberland Formation, latest Campanian) of Hornby Island, British Columbia, Canada. The genus name Maaqwi comes from the Coast Salish "ma'aqwi" meaning "water bird," and the specific epithet cascadensis reflects the fossil's origin from the Cascadia region of Western North America. The genus is known from a single specimen, RBCM.EH2008.011.01120. It consists of a coracoid, humerus, ulna, and radius in a nodule of mudstone. The specimen is housed in the Royal British Columbia Museum. Maaqwi had an estimated body mass of 1.5 kg.

References

Late Cretaceous birds of North America
Prehistoric bird genera
Prehistoric ornithurans